Barres may refer to:

People

Barrès
 Maurice Barrès (1862–1923), French novelist
 Philippe Barrès (1896–1975), French journalist (son of Maurice)
 Claude Barrès (1925–1959), French Army officer  (son of Philippe & grandson of Maurice)

Barres
 Ben Barres (1954–2017), an American neurobiologist
 John Barres (b.  1960), U.S. Catholic priest, appointed Bishop of Allentown in 2009 (later appointed to Rockville Centre)

Des Barres
 Everard des Barres (also Eberhard von Barres or De Bären; died 1174), the third Grand Master of the Knights Templar 
 Michael Des Barres (b. 1948), 26th Marquis Des Barres, British actor and rock singer
 Pamela Des Barres (born Pamela Ann Miller in 1948), an American former rock and roll groupie, author, and magazine writer (wife of Michael)

Places 
France
 Boulay-les-Barres, a commune in the Loiret department 
 Cours-les-Barres, a commune in the Cher department 
 Lacapelle-Barrès, a commune in the Cantal department 
 Saint-Vincent-de-Barrès, a commune in the Ardèche department

Spain
 Barres (Castropol), a civil parish in Asturias

Other uses 
 Barres (film), a 1984 film by Luc Moullet